Notsi is an Austronesian language spoken in New Ireland, Papua New Guinea. It is spoken in eastern coastal villages among Kuot, a language isolate.

References

Languages of New Ireland Province
Meso-Melanesian languages